Adolf Echtler (5 May 1843, Danzig - 23 September 1914, Munich) was a German genre painter; noted for his detailed scenes and facial expressions.

Life and work
His father, was a painter and photographer. In 1847, he accompanied his father to Riga, then on to Saint Petersburg in 1850. There, he was given his first painting lessons. For health reasons, he went to Venice around 1860, where he studied at the Accademia di Belle Arti di Venezia. Later, he enrolled at the Academy of Fine Arts, Munich. His primary instructor there was Wilhelm von Diez.

He began exhibiting in 1869; showing his works Munich, Berlin, Düsseldorf, Dresden and Königsberg.

He was married in Aachen in 1876. From the following year to 1886, he and his wife lived in Paris, where he exhibited at the Salon from 1879 to 1885. His son, also named Adolf, was born in 1878. He left Paris after his wife died; returning to Munich with his son.

In 1896, he was awarded a large gold medal at the Große Berliner Kunstausstellung. He would revisit Venice several times. Many of his works were published in Die Gartenlaube.

He was named an Honorary Member of the Munich Academy, and held the title of Royal Professor. Two of his works were purchased by Luitpold, Prince Regent of Bavaria, and some were widely reproduced.

Sources 
 Short autobiography, In: Das geistige Deutschland am Ende des 19. Jahrhunderts. Enzyklopädie des deutschen Geisteslebens in biographischen Skizzen. Vol.1: "Die Bildenden Künstler". Leipzig/Berlin 1898
 Willy Burger, "Echtler, Adolf", In: Allgemeines Lexikon der Bildenden Künstler von der Antike bis zur Gegenwart, Vol. 10: Dubolon–Erlwein, E. A. Seemann, Leipzig 1914, pp. 315–316 (Online)
 Horst Ludwig: "Ernst Zimmermann, Alois Erdtelt und Adolf Echtler. Münchner Maler der Gründerzeit. Wilhelm Diez und seine Schule". In: Weltkunst #50, 1980, pp. 1024–1026

External links 

 More works by Echtler @ ArtNet

1843 births
1914 deaths
19th-century German painters
19th-century German male artists
German genre painters
Academy of Fine Arts, Munich alumni
Artists from Gdańsk
20th-century German painters
20th-century German male artists